Thierry Daniel Henry (born 17 August 1977) is a French professional football coach, pundit, and former player. Considered one of the best strikers of all time, one of the best players to play in the Premier League, and Arsenal's greatest player, Henry was runner-up for both the Ballon d'Or in 2003 and the FIFA World Player of the Year in 2003 and 2004. He was named the FWA Footballer of the Year a record three times, the PFA Players' Player of the Year a joint-record two times, and was named in the PFA Team of the Year six consecutive times. He was also included in the FIFA FIFPro World XI once and the UEFA Team of the Year five times.

Henry made his professional debut with Monaco in 1994 before signing for defending Serie A champions Juventus. However, limited playing time, coupled with disagreements with the club's hierarchy, led to him signing for Premier League club Arsenal for £11 million in 1999. Under long-time mentor and coach Arsène Wenger, Henry became a prolific striker and Arsenal's all-time leading scorer with 228 goals in all competitions. He won the Premier League Golden Boot a record four times, won two FA Cups and two Premier League titles with the club, including one during an unbeaten Invincible season. Henry spent his final two seasons with Arsenal as club captain, leading them to the 2006 UEFA Champions League Final. Henry transferred to Barcelona in 2007 and in the 2008–09 season, he was a key part of the club's historic treble when they won La Liga, the Copa del Rey, and the UEFA Champions League. In 2010, he joined Major League Soccer (MLS) club New York Red Bulls and returned to Arsenal on loan for two months in 2012, before retiring in 2014.

Henry had success with France, winning the 1998 FIFA World Cup, UEFA Euro 2000, and 2003 FIFA Confederations Cup. He was named French Player of the Year a record five times, named to the UEFA Euro 2000 Team of the Tournament, awarded both the 2003 FIFA Confederations Cup Golden Ball and Golden Shoe, and named to the 2006 FIFA World Cup All-Star Team. In October 2007, he became his country's record goalscorer, a record he held until December 2022. After amassing 123 appearances and 51 goals, Henry retired from international football after the 2010 FIFA World Cup.

After retiring, Henry transitioned into coaching. He began coaching Arsenal's youth teams in February 2015, in tandem with his work as a pundit for Sky Sports. In 2016, he was appointed as an assistant coach at Belgium, before assuming the role as the head coach at Monaco in 2018. He was relieved of his duties at Monaco in January 2019 and returned to MLS less than a year later to manage Montréal Impact. He led Montréal to the playoffs in the 2020 season before departing in 2021, returning to his role as an assistant coach for Belgium for a year and a half.

Early years
Henry is of Antillean heritage: his father, Antoine, is from Guadeloupe (La Désirade island), and his mother, Maryse, is from Martinique. He was born and raised in Les Ulis suburb of Paris which, despite sometimes being seen as a tough neighbourhood, provided good footballing facilities. As a seven-year-old, Henry showed great potential, prompting Claude Chezelle to recruit him to the local club CO Les Ulis. His father pressured him to attend training, although the youngster was not particularly drawn to football. He joined US Palaiseau in 1989, but after a year his father fell out with the club, so Henry moved to ES Viry-Châtillon and played there for two years. US Palaiseau coach Jean-Marie Panza, Henry's future mentor, followed him there.

Club career

1992–1999: Beginnings at Monaco and transfer to Juventus
In 1990, Monaco sent scout Arnold Catalano to watch Henry, then at the age of 13 in a match. Henry scored all six goals as his side won 6–0. Catalano asked him to join Monaco without even attending a trial first. Catalano requested that Henry complete a course at the elite INF Clairefontaine academy, and despite the director's reluctance to admit Henry due to his poor school results, he was allowed to complete the course and joined Arsène Wenger's Monaco as a youth player. Subsequently, Henry signed professional forms with Monaco, and made his professional debut on 31 August 1994, in a 2–0 loss against Nice. Although Wenger suspected that Henry should be deployed as a striker, he put Henry on the left wing because he believed that his pace, natural ball control and skill would be more effective against full backs than centre-backs.

After a tentative start to his Monaco career, Henry was named the French Young Footballer of the Year in 1996, and in the 1996–97 season, his solid performances helped the club win the Ligue 1 title. During the 1997–98 season, he was instrumental in leading his club to the UEFA Champions League semi-final, setting a French record by scoring seven goals in the competition. By his third season, he had received his first cap for the national team, and was part of the winning team in the 1998 FIFA World Cup. He continued to impress at his tenure with Monaco, and in his five seasons with the club, the young winger scored 20 league goals in 105 appearances.

Henry left Monaco in January 1999, one year before his intimate and closest teammate David Trezeguet, and moved to Italian club Juventus for £10.5 million. He played on the wing, as well as at wing back and wide midfield, but he was ineffective as a goal scorer, struggling against the defensive discipline exhibited by teams in Serie A, registering just three goals in 16 appearances. In 2019, on Jamie Carragher’s podcast The Greatest Game, Henry attributed disagreements with Juve director Luciano Moggi as his rationale behind departing the club.

1999–2007: Move to Arsenal, breakthrough, and success

Unsettled in Italy, Henry transferred from Juventus on 3 August 1999 to Arsenal for an estimated fee of £11 million, reuniting with his former manager Arsène Wenger. It was at Arsenal that Henry made his name as a world-class footballer, and although his transfer was not without controversy, Wenger was convinced he was worth the transfer fee. Brought in as a replacement for fellow French forward Nicolas Anelka, Henry was immediately moulded into a striker by Wenger, a move that would pay rich dividends in years to come. However, doubts were raised about his ability to adapt to the quick and physical English game when he failed to score in his first eight games. After several difficult months in England, Henry even conceded that he had to "be re-taught everything about the art of striking." These doubts were dispelled when he ended his first season at Arsenal with an impressive goal tally of 26. Arsenal finished second in the Premier League behind Manchester United, and lost in the UEFA Cup Final against Galatasaray.

Coming off the back of a victorious UEFA Euro 2000 campaign with the national team, Henry was ready to make an impact in the 2000–01 season. Despite recording fewer goals and assists than his first season, Henry's second season with Arsenal proved to be a breakthrough, as he became the club's top goalscorer. His goal tally included a spectacular strike against Manchester United where he flicked the ball up (with his back turned to goal), before he swivelled and volleyed in from 20 yards out. The strike also featured a memorable goal celebration where he recreated the Budweiser "Whassup?" advertisement. Armed with one of the league's best attacks, Arsenal finished runner-up to perennial rivals Manchester United in the Premier League. The team also reached the final of the FA Cup, losing 2–1 to Liverpool. Henry remained frustrated, however, by the fact that he had yet to help the club win honours, and frequently expressed his desire to establish Arsenal as a powerhouse.

Success finally arrived during the 2001–02 season. Arsenal finished seven points above Liverpool to win the Premier League title, and defeated Chelsea 2–0 in the FA Cup Final. Henry became the league's top goalscorer and netted 32 goals in all competitions as he led Arsenal to a double and his first silverware with the club. There was much expectation that Henry would replicate his club form for France during the 2002 FIFA World Cup, but the defending champions suffered a shock exit at the group stage.

2002–03 proved to be another productive season for Henry, as he scored 32 goals in all competitions while contributing 23 assists—remarkable returns for a striker. In doing so, he led Arsenal to another FA Cup triumph (where he was man-of-the-match in the Final), although Arsenal failed to retain their Premier League title. Throughout the season, he competed with Manchester United's Ruud van Nistelrooy for the league scoring title, but the Dutchman edged Henry to the Golden Boot by a single goal. Nonetheless, Henry was named both the PFA Players' Player of the Year and FWA Footballer of the Year. His rising status as one of the world's best footballers was affirmed when he emerged runner-up for the 2003 FIFA World Player of the Year award. With 24 goals and 20 assists in the league, Henry set a new record for most assists in a single Premier League season, and also became the first player in history to record at least 20 goals and 20 assists in a single season in one of Europe's top–five leagues—this feat has since been matched by Lionel Messi in 2020.

Entering the 2003–04 season, Arsenal were determined to reclaim the Premier League crown. Henry was again instrumental in Arsenal's exceptionally successful campaign; together with the likes of Dennis Bergkamp, Patrick Vieira, Freddie Ljungberg and Robert Pires, Henry ensured that the Gunners became the first team in more than a century to go through the entire domestic league season unbeaten, claiming the league title in the process. Apart from being named for the second year running as the PFA Players' Player of the Year and FWA Footballer of the Year, Henry emerged once again as the runner-up for 2004 FIFA World Player of the Year award. With 39 goals scored in all competitions, the Frenchman led the league in goals scored and won the European Golden Boot. However, as was the case in 2002, Henry was unable to lead the national side to honours during UEFA Euro 2004.

This dip in success was compounded when Arsenal failed again to secure back-to-back league titles when they lost out to Chelsea in the 2004–05 season, although Arsenal did win the FA Cup (the Final of which Henry missed through injury). Henry maintained his reputation as one of Europe's most feared strikers as he led the league in scoring, and with 31 goals in all competitions, he was the co-recipient (with Diego Forlán) of the European Golden Boot, becoming the first player to officially win the award twice in a row (Ally McCoist had won two Golden Boots in a row, but both were deemed unofficial). The unexpected departure of Arsenal's captain Patrick Vieira in the 2005 close season led to Henry being awarded club captaincy, a role which many felt was not naturally suited for him; the captaincy is more commonly given to defenders or midfielders, who are better-placed on the pitch to read the game. Along with being chief goalscorer, he was responsible for leading a very young team which had yet to gel fully.

The 2005–06 season proved to be one of remarkable personal achievements for Henry. On 17 October 2005, Henry became the club's top goalscorer of all time; two goals against Sparta Prague in the Champions League meant he broke Ian Wright's record of 185 goals. On 1 February 2006, he scored a goal against West Ham United, bringing his league goal tally up to 151, breaking Arsenal legend Cliff Bastin's league goals record. Henry scored his 100th league goal at Highbury, a feat unparalleled in the history of the club, and a unique achievement in the Premier League. On the final day of the Premier League season, Henry scored a hat-trick against Wigan Athletic in the last match played at Highbury. He completed the season as the league's top goalscorer, was voted the FWA Footballer of the Year for the third time in his career, and was selected in the FIFA World XI.

Nevertheless, Arsenal failed to win the Premier League title again, but hopes of a trophy were revived when Arsenal reached the 2006 UEFA Champions League Final. The Gunners eventually lost 2–1 to Barcelona, with Henry assisting the team's only goal from a free kick, and Arsenal's inability to win the league title for two consecutive seasons combined with the relative inexperience of the Arsenal squad caused much speculation that Henry would leave for another club. However, he declared his love for the club and accepted a four-year contract, and said he would stay at Arsenal for life. Arsenal vice-chairman David Dein later claimed the club had turned down two bids of £50 million from Spanish clubs for Henry before the signing of the new contract. Had the transfer materialised, it would have surpassed the then-world record £47 million paid for Zinedine Zidane.

Henry's 2006–07 season was marred by injuries. Although he scored 10 goals in 17 domestic appearances for Arsenal, Henry's season was cut short in February. Having missed games due to hamstring, foot, and back problems, he was deemed fit enough to come on as a late substitute against PSV in a Champions League match, but began limping shortly after coming on. Scans the next day revealed that he would need at least three months to heal from new groin and stomach injuries, missing the rest of the 2006–07 season. Wenger attributed Henry's injuries to a protracted 2005–06 campaign, and reiterated that Henry was keen on staying with the Gunners to rebuild for the 2007–08 season.

2007–2010: Barcelona and a historic treble

On 25 June 2007, in an unexpected turn of events, Henry was transferred to Barcelona for €24 million. He signed a four-year deal for a reported €6.8 (£4.6) million per season. It was revealed that the contract included a release clause of €125 (£84.9) million. Henry cited the departure of Dein and continued uncertainty over Wenger's future as reasons for leaving, and maintained that "I always said that if I ever left Arsenal it would be to play for Barcelona." Despite their captain's departure, Arsenal got off to an impressive start for the 2007–08 campaign, and Henry said that his presence in the team might have been more of a hindrance than a help. He stated, "Because of my seniority, the fact that I was captain and my habit of screaming for the ball, they would sometimes give it to me even when I was not in the best position. So in that sense it was good for the team that I moved on." Henry left Arsenal as the club's leading all-time league goalscorer with 174 goals and leading all-time goalscorer in European competitions with 42 goals; in July 2008, Arsenal fans voted him as Arsenal's greatest player ever in Arsenal.com's Gunners' Greatest 50 Players poll.

At Barcelona, Henry was given the number 14 jersey, the same as he had worn at Arsenal. He scored his first goal for his new club on 19 September 2007 in a 3–0 Champions League group stage win over Lyon, and he recorded his first hat-trick for Barça in a Primera División match against Levante ten days later. But with Henry mostly deployed on the wing throughout the season, he was unable to reproduce the goal-scoring form he achieved with Arsenal. He expressed dissatisfaction with the move to Barcelona in the initial year, amidst widespread speculation of a return to the Premier League. In an interview with Garth Crooks on BBC’s Football Focus, Henry described missing life "back home" and even "the English press." However, Henry concluded his debut season as the club's top scorer with 19 goals in addition to nine league assists, second behind Lionel Messi's ten.

Henry went on to surpass this tally in a more integrated 2008–09 campaign, with 26 goals and 10 assists from the left wing. He won the first trophy of his Barcelona career on 13 May 2009 when Barcelona defeated Athletic Bilbao in the Copa del Rey final. Barcelona won the Primera División and UEFA Champions League soon after, completing a treble for the Frenchman, who had combined with Messi and Samuel Eto'o to score 100 goals between them that season. The trio was also the most prolific trio in Spanish league history, scoring 72 goals and surpassing the 66 goals of Real Madrid's Ferenc Puskás, Alfredo Di Stéfano and Luis del Sol of the 1960–61 season (this was later surpassed by Real Madrid trio Cristiano Ronaldo, Karim Benzema and Gonzalo Higuaín who scored 89 goals in 2011–12). Later in 2009, Henry helped Barcelona win an unprecedented sextuple, consisting of the aforementioned treble, the Supercopa de España, the UEFA Super Cup, and the FIFA Club World Cup.

The following season, the emergence of Pedro meant that Henry only started 15 league games. Before the La Liga season ended, and with a year still left on his contract, club president Joan Laporta stated on 5 May 2010 that Henry "may go away in the summer transfer window if that's what he wants." After Henry returned from the 2010 World Cup, Barcelona confirmed that they had agreed to the sale of Henry to an unnamed club, with the player still to agree terms with the new club.

2010–2014: New York Red Bulls and retirement

In July 2010, Henry signed a multi-year contract with Major League Soccer (MLS) club New York Red Bulls for the 2010 season as its second designated player. He made his full MLS debut on 31 July in a 2–2 draw against Houston Dynamo, assisting both goals to Juan Pablo Ángel. His first MLS goal came on 28 August in a 2–0 victory against San Jose Earthquakes. The Red Bulls eventually topped the MLS Eastern Conference by one point over Columbus Crew before losing 3–2 on aggregate against San Jose Earthquakes in the quarter-finals of the 2010 MLS Cup Playoffs. The next season, the Red Bulls were 10th overall in the league, and bowed out in the Conference semi-finals of the 2011 MLS Cup Playoffs.

Return to Arsenal (loan)
After training with Arsenal during the MLS off-season, Henry re-signed for the club on a two-month loan deal on 6 January 2012. This was to provide cover for Gervinho and Marouane Chamakh, who were unavailable due to their participation in the 2012 Africa Cup of Nations. Henry was given the number 12 jersey – his old Arsenal number 14 jersey, the same number he wore at Barcelona and New York, was unavailable, with Theo Walcott inheriting it following Henry's departure from the club in 2007. Henry made his second Arsenal debut as a substitute against Leeds United in the FA Cup third round and scored the only goal. In his last league game on loan, he scored the winning goal in stoppage time in a 2–1 win against Sunderland. His final goals for the club meant he finished his Arsenal career with a record 228 goals; 175 of them came in the Premier League.

Return to New York Red Bulls

On 17 February 2012, Henry returned to Red Bulls to prepare for the 2012 season. His base salary of $5 million ($5.6 million guaranteed) made him the highest-paid player in MLS—surpassing David Beckham, who had taken a salary cut for his last year with the Los Angeles Galaxy. In 2013, Henry's base salary dropped to $3.75 million setting him behind Robbie Keane's $4 million base salary. With bonuses, however, Henry remained the highest-paid player with $4.35 million compared to Keane's $4.33 million.

On 31 March 2012, Henry scored his first MLS hat-trick in a 5–2 Red Bulls win over the Montreal Impact. He was named MLS Player of the Month that same month. On 27 October 2013, Henry scored once and provided two assists in the last game of the season against the Chicago Fire at Red Bull Arena to help his team win 5–2 and become champions of the regular season. It was the club's first major trophy in their 17-year history.

On 12 July 2014, Henry provided a goal and three assists in a 4–1 Red Bulls win over the Columbus Crew. With that effort he became the all-time assist leader for the New York Red Bulls with 37, surpassing Amado Guevara and Tab Ramos.

On 1 December 2014, it was announced that Henry had left the Red Bulls after four-and-a-half years at the club. On 16 December, he announced his retirement as a player and stated that he would begin working for Sky Sports as a pundit. After working at Sky for over three years, Henry quit his position in July 2018 to focus on his career as a coach.

International career

Henry enjoyed a successful career with the France national team, winning the first of his 123 caps in June 1997, when his good form for Monaco was rewarded with a call-up to the Under-20 French national team, where he played in the 1997 FIFA World Youth Championship alongside future teammates William Gallas and David Trezeguet. Within four months, France head coach Aimé Jacquet called Henry up to the senior team. The 20-year-old made his senior international debut on 11 October 1997 in a 2–1 win against South Africa. Jacquet was so impressed with Henry that he took him to the 1998 FIFA World Cup. Although Henry was a largely unknown quantity at international level, he ended the tournament as France's top scorer with three goals. He was scheduled to appear as a substitute in the final, where France beat Brazil 3–0, but Marcel Desailly's sending off forced a defensive change instead. In 1998, he was made a Knight of the Legion of Honour, France's highest decoration.

Henry was a member of France's UEFA Euro 2000 squad, again scoring three goals in the tournament, including the equaliser against Portugal in the semi-final, and finishing as the country's top scorer. France later won the game in extra time following a converted penalty kick by Zinedine Zidane. France went on to defeat Italy in extra-time in the final, earning Henry his second major international medal. During the tournament, Henry was voted man of the match in three games, including the final against Italy.

The 2002 FIFA World Cup featured a stunning early exit for both Henry and France as the defending champions were eliminated in the group stage after failing to score a goal in all three games. France lost against Senegal in their first group match and Henry was red carded for a dangerous sliding challenge in their next match against Uruguay. In that game, France played to a 0–0 draw, but Henry was forced to miss the final group match due to suspension; France lost 2–0 to Denmark.

Henry returned to form for his country at the 2003 FIFA Confederations Cup. Despite playing without team stalwarts Zidane and Patrick Vieira, France won, in large part owing to Henry's outstanding play, for which he was named Man of the Match by FIFA's Technical Study Group in three of France's five matches. In the final, he scored the golden goal in extra time to lift the title for the host country after a 1–0 victory over Cameroon. Henry was awarded both the Adidas Golden Ball as the outstanding player of the competition and the Adidas Golden Shoe as the tournament's top goalscorer with four goals.

In UEFA Euro 2004, Henry played in all of France's matches and scored two goals. France beat England in the group stage but lost to the eventual winners Greece 1–0 in the quarter-finals. During the 2006 FIFA World Cup Henry remained as one of the automatic starters in the squad. He played as a lone striker, but despite an indifferent start to the tournament, became one of the top players of the World Cup. He scored three goals, including the winning goal from Zidane's free kick against defending champions Brazil in the quarter-final. However, France subsequently lost to Italy on penalties (5–3) in the final. Henry did not take part in the penalty shoot-out, having been substituted in extra time after his legs had cramped. Henry was one of ten nominees for the Golden Ball award for Player of the Tournament, an award which was ultimately presented to his teammate, Zidane and was named a starting striker on the 2006 FIFPro World XI team.

On 13 October 2007, Henry scored his 41st goal against the Faroe Islands, joining Michel Platini as the country's top goalscorer of all time. Four days later at the Stade de la Beaujoire, he scored a late double against Lithuania, thereby setting a new record as France's top goalscorer. On 3 June 2008, Henry made his 100th appearance for the national team in a match against Colombia, becoming the sixth French player ever to reach that milestone.

Henry missed the opening game of France's short-lived UEFA Euro 2008 campaign, where they were eliminated in the group stages after being drawn in the same group as Italy, the Netherlands and Romania. He scored France's only goal in the competition in a 4–1 loss to the Netherlands.

The French team struggled during the 2010 FIFA World Cup qualifiers and finished second in their group behind Serbia. During the play-offs against the Republic of Ireland, Henry was involved in a controversy in the second leg of the game at the Stade de France on 18 November 2009. With the aggregate score tied at 1–1 and the game in extra time, he used his hand twice to control the ball before delivering a cross to William Gallas who scored the winner. This sparked a barrage of criticism against the Frenchman, while national team coach Raymond Domenech and Arsenal manager Arsène Wenger defended him. The Football Association of Ireland lodged a formal complaint with FIFA, seeking a replay of the game, which FIFA declined. Henry said that he contemplated retiring from international football after the reactions to the incident, but maintained that he was not a "cheat"; hours after FIFA had ruled out a replay, he stated that "the fairest solution would be to replay the game". FIFA President Sepp Blatter described the incident as "blatant unfair play" and announced an inquiry into how such incidents could be avoided in future, and added that the incident would be investigated by the Disciplinary Committee. Blatter also said Henry told him that his family had been threatened in the aftermath of the incident. In January 2010, FIFA announced that there was no legal basis to sanction Henry.

Henry did not feature in the starting line-up for France at the 2010 FIFA World Cup. France drew in their first game against Uruguay, and lost 2–0 in their second against Mexico. The team was thrown into disarray when Nicolas Anelka was expelled from the team, and captain Patrice Evra led a team protest by refusing to train. In the final group game against host-nation South Africa in which Henry came on as a second-half substitute, France lost 2–1 and were eliminated from the tournament. He then announced his retirement from international football, having won 123 caps and scored 51 goals for Les Bleus, thus finishing his international career as France's all-time top scorer, and second most capped player after Lilian Thuram.

Style of play

Although Henry played up front as a striker during his youth, he spent his time at Monaco and Juventus playing on the wing. When Henry joined Arsenal in 1999, Wenger immediately changed this, switching Henry to his childhood position, often pairing him with Dutch veteran Dennis Bergkamp. During the 2004–05 season, Wenger switched Arsenal's formation to 4–5–1. This change forced Henry to adapt again to fit into the Arsenal team, and he played many games as a lone striker. Still, Henry remained Arsenal's main offensive threat, on many occasions conjuring spectacular goals. Wenger said of his fellow Frenchman: "Thierry Henry could take the ball in the middle of the park and score a goal that no one else in the world could score".

One of the reasons cited for Henry's impressive play up front is his ability to calmly score from one-on-ones. According to his father Antoine, Henry learned precision shooting from watching his idol Marco van Basten. He was also influenced by Romário, Ronaldo and Liberian star George Weah, a new breed of strikers in the 1990s who would also operate outside the penalty area before running with the ball towards goal. At his physical peak from the late 1990s to the mid 2000s, Henry's ability to dribble past opponents with exceptional pace, skill and composure, meant that he could get in behind defenders regularly enough to score. In 2004, former Arsenal striker Alan Smith commented on Henry: "I have to say I haven't seen a player like him. He's an athlete with great technical ability and a tremendous desire to be the best."

When up front, Henry is occasionally known to move out wide to the left wing position, something which enables him to contribute heavily in assists: between 2002–03 and 2004–05, the striker managed almost 50 assists in total and this was attributed to his unselfish play and creativity. Ranking Henry the greatest player in Premier League history, in February 2020 FourFourTwo magazine stated, "No one assisted more in a season. No one has terrorised defenders with such a combination of bewitching grace and phenomenal power."

Coming in from the left, Henry's trademark finish saw him place the ball inside the far right corner of the goal. Henry would also drift offside to fool the defence then run back onside before the ball is played and beat the offside trap, although he never provided Arsenal a distinct aerial threat. Given his versatility in being able to operate as both a winger and a striker, the Frenchman is not a prototypical "out-and-out striker", but he has emerged consistently as one of Europe's most prolific strikers. In set pieces, Henry was the first-choice penalty and free kick taker for Arsenal, scoring regularly from those positions. Henry was also a notable exponent of a no-look pass where he would feint to pass the ball with his right foot, but would make contact with the ball using his standing foot (his left).

Managerial career

Arsenal youth

Henry began coaching Arsenal's youth teams in February 2015, in tandem with his work for Sky Sports. His influence on the team was praised by players such as Alex Iwobi, who dedicated a goal against Bayern Munich in the 2015–16 UEFA Youth League to his advice. Having earned a UEFA A Licence, he was offered the job of under-18 coach by Academy head Andries Jonker, but the decision was overruled by Wenger, who wanted a full-time coach for the team.

Belgium (assistant)
In August 2016, Henry became second assistant coach of the Belgium national team, working alongside head coach Roberto Martínez and fellow assistant Graeme Jones. In an interview with NBC Sports, Belgium striker Romelu Lukaku praised Henry for his work with him, stating, "Henry is the best thing that has happened to me because since I came to England aged 18 I have had the best mentors. Thierry for me is the best. Every day whether it is positive and negative I take it in my stride because I know what is expected from the top level.” At the 2018 FIFA World Cup, Belgium reached the semi-final, but lost to Henry's home nation France 1–0. Henry picked up a Bronze medal after Belgium defeated England 2–0 in the third-place play-off to secure their best ever World Cup finish.

Henry was reportedly offered the position of head coach by Bordeaux in August 2018. However, the offer was not accepted by Henry after disagreements with the club's owners. Days after turning down the Bordeaux job, and following Jones's departure from the Belgium national team, Henry, who had been the forwards coach, was promoted to Belgium assistant coach. However, his tenure in the role was short-lived, after he accepted the role as head coach at former club Monaco in October.

Monaco
On 11 October 2018, Monaco dismissed Leonardo Jardim as club manager. Jardim's position had become untenable after struggling heavily in domestic competition, with the club 18th at the time of his departure, and disputes over the club's transfer policy. Monaco's search for a new coach coincided with the regulatory mid-season international break, allowing the club sufficient time to search for a replacement, however, they quickly decided on Henry, and he was appointed a mere two days later. He signed a three-year deal, and was unveiled as Monaco manager on 18 October. At his first press conference, he told reporters: "This club will always have a big place in my heart, so to be able to come here and start again, it is a dream come true. There is a lot of work to do, as you can imagine – but I am more than happy to be here".

Henry's arrival at Monaco was greeted with mixed reactions by some media outlets, due to his relative inexperience as a top-level coach and the task of overturning Monaco's misfortunes. Despite inheriting a squad of sub-standard quality, Henry expressed a desire of replicating the football he played under Pep Guardiola at Barcelona, as well as instilling the "professionalism" taught to him by Arsène Wenger. Henry also adopted a hands-on approach to training sessions, being regularly involved in devising schemes and instructing drills. His first match was a 2–1 away defeat against Strasbourg on 20 October. He was unable to secure a win for over a month, enduring a period which included two high-profile defeats against Club Brugge and Paris Saint-Germain, prior to defeating Caen on 1–0 on 25 November. He secured two wins in December, defeating Amiens in the league and Lorient in the Coupe de la Ligue, however, this was on the backdrop of three additional Ligue 1 defeats to close 2018 in the relegation zone.

In January 2019, Henry entered the winter transfer window, where he signed left-back Fodé Ballo-Touré, and former Arsenal teammate Cesc Fàbregas from Chelsea. He also sanctioned the loan signing of French defensive midfielder William Vainqueur on 12 January, and experienced defender Naldo. However, these signings would not turn around the club's fate, and on 24 January, Henry was dismissed at Monaco. The club were 19th at the time of his departure, and Henry left with a record of 4 wins, 5 draws, and 11 defeats, from 20 games in charge.

Montreal Impact
On 14 November 2019, Henry signed with Major League Soccer side Montreal Impact, signing a two-year deal until the end of the 2021 season, with an option to extend it by a year until the 2022 season. In his first press conference, Henry stated he had to "confront" the relative disappointment of his short stint as manager of Monaco, before undertaking a new job.

After leading Montreal to their first playoff berth in four seasons, on 25 February 2021, prior to the 2021 season, Henry stepped down as head coach of the renamed CF Montreal to be closer to his children in London. He had not been able to see them in the 2020 season due to travel restrictions during the COVID-19 pandemic, and with restrictions continuing into the 2021 season, he decided to end the separation.

Return to Belgium (assistant)
In May 2021, Henry rejoined the coaching staff of Belgium prior to the UEFA Euro 2020. He was also in the team's coaching staff for the 2022 FIFA World Cup. In February 2023, upon the appointment of Domenico Tedesco as Belgium's new head coach, Royal Belgian Football Association CEO Peter Bossaert announced that Henry would not be returning to the national team's coaching staff.

Como (stakeholder)
In August 2022, Serie B club Como announced Henry was joining them as an investor and minority stakeholder.

Reception

Henry has received many plaudits and awards in his football career. He was runner-up for the 2003 and 2004 FIFA World Player of the Year awards; in those two seasons, he also won back-to-back PFA Players' Player of the Year titles. Henry is the only player ever to have won the FWA Footballer of the Year three times (2003, 2004, 2006), and the French Player of the Year on a record four occasions. Henry was voted into the Premier League Overseas Team of the Decade in the 10 Seasons Awards poll in 2003, and in 2004 he was named by football legend Pelé on the FIFA 100 list of the world's greatest living players.

In terms of goal-scoring awards, Henry was the European Golden Boot winner in 2004 and 2005 (sharing it with Villarreal's Diego Forlán in 2005). Henry was also the top goalscorer in the Premier League for a record four seasons (2002, 2004, 2005, 2006). In 2006, he became the first player to score more than 20 goals in the league for five consecutive seasons (2002 to 2006). With 175, Henry is currently seventh in the list of all-time Premier League goalscorers, behind Alan Shearer, Wayne Rooney, Harry Kane, Andy Cole, Sergio Agüero, and Frank Lampard. He held the record for most goals in the competition for one club, until it was broken by Rooney in 2016, and held the record for most goals by a foreign player in the competition until surpassed by Agüero in 2020. France's all-time record goalscorer was, in his prime in the mid 2000s, regarded by many coaches, footballers and journalists as one of the best players in the world. In November 2007, he was ranked 33rd on the Association of Football Statisticians' compendium for "Greatest Ever Footballers."

Arsenal fans honoured their former player in 2008, declaring Henry the greatest Arsenal player. In two other 2008 surveys, Henry emerged as the favourite Premier League player of all time among 32,000 people surveyed in the Barclays 2008 Global Fan Report. Arsenal fan and The Who lead singer Roger Daltrey mentions Henry in the tribute song "Highbury Highs", which he performed at Arsenal's last game at Highbury on 7 May 2006. On 10 December 2011, Arsenal unveiled a bronze statue of Henry at the Emirates Stadium as part of its 125th anniversary celebrations. In 2017, FourFourTwo magazine ranked him first in their list of the 30 best strikers in Premier League history. Daniel Girard of The Toronto Star described Henry as "one of the best players of his generation" in 2010. Henry's former Arsenal manager, Wenger, described him as "one of the greatest players [he had] ever seen" in 2014. In 2019, The Independent ranked Henry in first place in their list of the "100 greatest Premier League players."

Personal life

Henry married English model Nicole Merry, real name Claire, on 5 July 2003. The ceremony was held at Highclere Castle, and on 27 May 2005 the couple celebrated the birth of their first child, Téa. Henry dedicated his first goal following Téa's birth to her by holding his fingers in a "T" shape and kissing them after scoring in a match against Newcastle United. When Henry was still at Arsenal, he also purchased a home in Hampstead, North London.

However, shortly after his transfer to Barcelona, it was announced that Henry and his wife would divorce; the decree nisi was granted in September 2007, "on the basis of his behavior." Their separation concluded in December 2008 when Henry paid Merry a divorce settlement close to her requested sum of £10 million.

Interest in basketball
As a fan of the National Basketball Association (NBA), Henry is often seen with his friend Tony Parker at games when not playing football. Henry stated in an interview that he admires basketball, as it is similar to football in pace and excitement. Having made regular trips to the NBA Finals in the past, he went to watch Parker and the San Antonio Spurs in the 2007 NBA Finals; and in the 2001 NBA Finals, he went to Philadelphia to help with French television coverage of the Finals as well as to watch Allen Iverson, whom he named as one of his favourite players.

Appearance on screen
Henry makes a short cameo appearance in the 2015 film Entourage. Henry's part sees him walking a dog and having exchange with Ari Gold (character played by Jeremy Piven), who is an over-the-top Hollywood agent. He makes a number of cameo appearances playing himself in the Apple TV+ football comedy series Ted Lasso.

Henry makes a number of appearances in the Amazon Original sports docuseries All or Nothing: Arsenal, which documented the club by spending time with the coaching staff and players behind the scenes both on and off the field throughout their 2021–22 season.

Social causes
Henry is a member of the UNICEF-FIFA squad, where together with other professional footballers he appeared in a series of TV spots seen by hundreds of millions of fans around the world during the 2002 and 2006 FIFA World Cups. In these spots, the players promote football as a game that must be played on behalf of children.

Having been subjected to racism in the past, Henry is an active spokesperson against racism in football. The most prominent incident of racism against Henry was during a training session with the Spanish national team in 2004, when a Spanish TV crew caught coach Luis Aragonés referring to Henry as "black shit" to José Antonio Reyes, Henry's teammate at Arsenal. The incident caused an uproar in the British media, and there were calls for Aragonés to be sacked. Henry and Nike started the Stand Up Speak Up campaign against racism in football as a result of the incident. Subsequently, in 2007, Time featured him as one of the "Heroes & Pioneers" on the Time 100 list of the most influential people in the world.

Along with 45 other football players, Henry took part in FIFA's "Live for Love United" in 2002. The single was released in tandem with the 2002 FIFA World Cup and its proceeds went towards AIDS research. Henry also supports the Cystic Fibrosis Foundation and Cystic Fibrosis Trust.

Henry has also played in charity football games for various causes. In June 2018, he reunited with his France 1998 World Cup winning teammates to play a charity game against an All-Star team which included Jamaican sprinter Usain Bolt, with proceeds going to the Mecenet Cardiac Charity and the Children of the World fund. In a 3–2 win for France, Henry played a trademark no-look one-two pass with Zinedine Zidane before scoring with a 20-yard curling strike.

Commercial endorsements
In 2006, Henry was valued as the ninth-most commercially marketable footballer in the world, and throughout his career he has signed many endorsements and appeared in commercials.

Sportswear
At the beginning of his career, Henry signed with sportswear giant Nike. In the buildup to the 2002 World Cup in Korea and Japan, Henry featured in Nike's "Secret Tournament" advertisement, directed by Terry Gilliam, along with 24 superstar football players. In a 2004 advertisement, Henry pits his wits against others footballers in locations such as his bedroom and living room, which was partly inspired by Henry himself, who revealed that he always has a football nearby, even at home. In tandem with the 2006 FIFA World Cup, Henry also featured in Nike's Joga Bonito campaign, Portuguese for "beautiful game."

Henry's deal with Nike ended after the 2006 FIFA World Cup, when he signed a deal with Reebok to appear in their "I Am What I Am" campaign. As part of Reebok Entertainment's "Framed" series, Henry was the star of a half-hour episode that detailed the making of a commercial about himself directed by Spanish actress Paz Vega. In 2011, Henry switched to Puma boots.

Others
Henry featured in the Renault Clio advertisements in which he popularised the term va-va-voom, meaning "life" or "passion." His romantic interest in the commercial was his then-girlfriend, later his wife (now divorced), Claire Merry. "Va-va-voom" was subsequently added to the Concise Oxford English Dictionary.

In February 2007, Henry was named as one of the three global ambassadors of Gillette's "Champions Program," which purported to feature three of the "best-known, most widely respected and successful athletes competing today" and also showcased Roger Federer and Tiger Woods in a series of television commercials. In reaction to the handball controversy following the France vs Ireland 2010 FIFA World Cup qualifier, Gillette faced a boycott and accusations of doctoring French versions of their Champions poster, but subsequently released a statement backing Henry.

Henry was part of Pepsi's "Dare For More" campaign in 2005, alongside the likes of David Beckham and Ronaldinho. He starred in a 2014 advert for Beats headphones with other global football stars including Neymar and Luis Suárez, with the theme of "The Game Before the Game" and the players pre-game ritual of listening to music.

Henry featured on the front cover of the editions of EA Sports' FIFA video game series from FIFA 2001 to FIFA 2005. He was included as an icon to the Ultimate Team in FIFA 18. He was also a cover star for the Konami Pro Evolution Soccer video game series, and was featured on the covers of Pro Evolution Soccer 4 to Pro Evolution Soccer 6.

Career statistics

Club

International

Note

 Includes one appearance from the match against FIFA XI on 16 August 2000 which FIFA and the French Football Federation count as an official friendly match.

Managerial

Honours

Monaco
Division 1: 1996–97

Arsenal
Premier League: 2001–02, 2003–04
FA Cup: 2001–02, 2002–03
FA Community Shield: 2002, 2004
UEFA Champions League runner-up: 2005–06
UEFA Cup runner-up: 1999–2000

Barcelona
La Liga: 2008–09, 2009–10
Copa del Rey: 2008–09
Supercopa de España: 2009
UEFA Champions League: 2008–09
UEFA Super Cup: 2009
FIFA Club World Cup: 2009

New York Red Bulls
Supporters' Shield: 2013

France
FIFA World Cup: 1998; runner-up: 2006
UEFA European Championship: 2000
FIFA Confederations Cup: 2003

Individual
Ballon d'Or runner-up: 2003; third-place: 2006
FIFA World Player of the Year – Silver Award: 2003, 2004
European Golden Shoe: 2003–04, 2004–05 
Onze d'Or: 2003, 2006
FIFA World Cup All-Star Team: Germany 2006
FIFA Confederations Cup Golden Ball: France 2003
FIFA Confederations Cup Golden Shoe: France 2003
UNFP Division 1 Young Player of the Year: 1996–97
PFA Players' Player of the Year: 2002–03, 2003–04
PFA Team of the Year: 2000–01 Premier League, 2001–02 Premier League, 2002–03 Premier League, 2003–04 Premier League, 2004–05 Premier League, 2005–06 Premier League
PFA Team of the Century (1907–2007):
Team of the Century 1997–2007
Overall Team of the Century
FWA Footballer of the Year: 2002–03, 2003–04, 2005–06
Premier League Player of the Season: 2003–04, 2005–06
Premier League Golden Boot: 2001–02, 2003–04, 2004–05, 2005–06
Most assists in the Premier League: 2002–03
Golden Boot Landmark Award 10: 2004–05
Golden Boot Landmark Award 20: 2004–05
Premier League Player of the Month: April 2000, September 2002, January 2004, April 2004
Arsenal Player of the Season: 2000, 2003, 2004, 2005
BBC Goal of the Season: 2002–03
UEFA Team of the Year: 2001, 2002, 2003, 2004, 2006
MLS Best XI: 2011, 2012, 2014
MLS Player of the Month: March 2012
Best MLS Player ESPY Award: 2013
MLS All-Star: 2011, 2012, 2013, 2014
French Player of the Year: 2000, 2003, 2004, 2005, 2006
IFFHS World's Top Goal Scorer of the Year: 2003
FIFA FIFPro World XI: 2006
UEFA European Football Championship Team of the Tournament: 2000
FIFA 100: 2004
Time 100 Heroes & Pioneers no.16: 2007
English Football Hall of Fame: 2008
Premier League 10 Seasons Awards (1992–93 – 2001–02)
 Overseas Team of the Decade
Premier League 20 Seasons Awards
 Fantasy Team (Panel choice)
 Fantasy Team (Public choice)
UEFA Ultimate Team of the Year (published 2015)
UEFA Euro All-time XI (published 2016)
Ballon d'Or Dream Team (Bronze): 2020
Premier League Hall of Fame: 2021

Orders
Knight of the Legion of Honour: 1998

Records

Arsenal 
All-time top scorer: 228 goals
Most league goals: 175 goals
Most European goals: 42
Most Champions League goals: 35
Most Premier League goals in a season: 30 (2003–04) (shared with Robin van Persie)
Most Premier League hat-tricks: 8
Most European appearances: 86 
Most Champions League appearances: 78
Most Arsenal Player of the Season Awards: 4

Continental 
Most European Golden Shoe wins while playing in England: 2 (2003–04 & 2004–05)
One of four players to win back-to-back European Golden Shoes (shared with Ally McCoist, Lionel Messi & Cristiano Ronaldo)

England 
Most FWA Footballer of the Year wins: 3 (2002–03, 2003–04 & 2005–06)
Most consecutive FWA Footballer of the Year wins: 2 (2002–03 & 2003–04) (shared with Cristiano Ronaldo)
Most consecutive PFA Players' Player of the Year wins: 2 (2002–03 & 2003–04) (shared with Cristiano Ronaldo)
Most  PFA Players' Player of the Year wins: 2 (2002–03 & 2003–04) (shared with Gareth Bale, Alan Shearer, Mark Hughes & Cristiano Ronaldo)

France 
Only French player to win the European Golden Shoe
Most French Player of the Year wins: 5 (2000, 2003, 2004, 2005, 2006)
Most consecutive French Player of the Year wins: 4 (2003–2006)
Most goals by a Frenchman playing at a foreign club: 228 goals for Arsenal
Most world cup matches for France: 17 (shared with Fabien Barthez)
Most appearances at World Cup final tournaments for France: 4 (1998, 2002, 2006 & 2010)

Premier League 
Most assists in a season: 20 (2002–03) (shared with Kevin De Bruyne)
Most goals with right foot in a 38-game season: 24 (2005–06) (shared with Alan Shearer)
Most Player of the Season awards: 2 (2003–04 & 2005–06) (shared with Cristiano Ronaldo, Nemanja Vidić & Kevin De Bruyne)
Most goals in London derbies: 43
Most Golden Boot wins: 4
Most goals on a Friday: 10
Most consecutive 20+ goal seasons: 5 (2001–02 to 2004–05) (shared with Sergio Agüero) 
Most goals scored under one manager: 175 goals under Arsène Wenger
Most goals at a single ground: 114 goals at Highbury 
Most direct free-kicks goals by a foreign player: 12 (shared with Gianfranco Zola)
Most Golden Boot's won in consecutive years: 3 (shared with Alan Sherear)
The only player to both score and assist 20+ goals in a season (2002–03)

See also 

 List of footballers with 100 or more UEFA Champions League appearances
 List of top international men's football goalscorers by country
 List of men's footballers with 100 or more international caps
 List of men's footballers with 50 or more international goals

Notes and references

External links

 
 
 
 Thierry Henry at FC Barcelona
 Thierry Henry  at JockBio.com
 
 

1977 births
Living people
French people of Guadeloupean descent
French people of Martiniquais descent
People from Les Ulis
Black French sportspeople
Footballers from Essonne
French footballers
Association football forwards
ES Viry-Châtillon players
INF Clairefontaine players
AS Monaco FC players
Juventus F.C. players
Arsenal F.C. players
FC Barcelona players
New York Red Bulls players
Ligue 1 players
Serie A players
Premier League players
La Liga players
Major League Soccer players
Designated Players (MLS)
Major League Soccer All-Stars
First Division/Premier League top scorers
UEFA Champions League winning players
English Football Hall of Fame inductees
Premier League Hall of Fame inductees
France youth international footballers
France under-21 international footballers
France international footballers
1998 FIFA World Cup players
UEFA Euro 2000 players
2002 FIFA World Cup players
2003 FIFA Confederations Cup players
UEFA Euro 2004 players
2006 FIFA World Cup players
UEFA Euro 2008 players
2010 FIFA World Cup players
FIFA World Cup-winning players
UEFA European Championship-winning players
FIFA Confederations Cup-winning players
FIFA Century Club
FIFA 100
French expatriate footballers
French expatriate sportspeople in Monaco
French expatriate sportspeople in Italy
French expatriate sportspeople in England
French expatriate sportspeople in Spain
French expatriate sportspeople in the United States
Expatriate footballers in Monaco
Expatriate footballers in Italy
Expatriate footballers in England
Expatriate footballers in Spain
Expatriate soccer players in the United States
French football managers
Arsenal F.C. non-playing staff
AS Monaco FC managers
CF Montréal coaches
Ligue 1 managers
Major League Soccer coaches
French expatriate football managers
French expatriate sportspeople in Belgium
French expatriate sportspeople in Canada
Expatriate football managers in Monaco
Expatriate soccer managers in Canada
UNICEF Goodwill Ambassadors
French anti-racism activists
Chevaliers of the Légion d'honneur
FA Cup Final players